Rattler (Gustav Krueger) is a fictional character appearing in American comic books published by Marvel Comics. He first appeared in Captain America #310 (October 1985), created by writer Mark Gruenwald and artist Paul Neary. The name Rattler was also used by two Marvel comics characters from the Wild West era, both enemies of the Rawhide Kid. A fourth Rattler appeared in the Spider-Man newspaper comic strip, who gained power  by being bitten by a snake and then treated with an experimental anti-venom.

He first showed up as part of the Serpent Society, a team of snake-themed villains for hire. During their first mission they were opposed by Captain America who would have several run-ins with the Serpent Society. Rattler was one of the Society Members who sided with Viper when she took over the Serpent Society, but remained with the group after she was deposed. At one point he was part of the Thunderbolts, but returned to the Serpent Society. He remained a member when the Society was reorganized into Serpent Solutions.

Publication history

Rattler first appeared in Captain America #310 (October 1985), created by writer Mark Gruenwald and artist Paul Neary.

Fictional character biography
Hailing from Germany, Rattler was given a bionic tail which he uses to create shockwaves and vibrations. This proved very useful in his first confrontation with Captain America, during the Rattler's initiation into the Serpent Society. He and his fellow Serpents Cobra and Anaconda were ambushed by the hero, but Rattler was able to use his tail to stop Captain America's shield from doing any damage. With the other Serpent Society members, he was hired by A.I.M. to hunt down MODOK. He later battled Captain America again after being tricked by the Porcupine, along with Diamondback, Death Adder, and Cottonmouth. During the ensuing fight with Captain America, Rattler used his bionic tail to send vibrations coursing through the hero's body, disorienting him.  However, he was eventually thrown into a pillar by his tail, knocking him out for the battle. Rattler, Cottonmouth, and Death Adder were sent to jail, but freed from jail by Sidewinder. Alongside Cottonmouth, Rattler confronted Kingpin's men over the Death Adder's murder.

The Rattler joined Viper during her invasion of the Serpent Society, and battled the Falcon. He subsequently followed Cobra's instructions when he became leader. He participated in the Serpent Society mission to recover mystic objects for Ghaur and Llyra. During the battle with the X-Men after Longshot had found the missing artifact they were searching for, Rattler created an avalanche by rattling his tail, though this took both Longshot and Rattler out in the process. Rattler voted against Diamondback during the Serpent Society's trial of her; alongside the Serpent Society, he then battled Captain America, Paladin, and Diamondback. The Rattler also participated in the battle against Force Works, where he initiated use of his "Rattling Gun", a gun that could supposedly create enough seismic waves to rattle someone's ribcage apart. He was eventually defeated by Hank Pym.

He has been seen as member of the Serpent Society under Cobra's leadership. After the group had captured and chained Captain America and Diamondback (really an L.M.D.) in this underground New York headquarters the pair escaped. S.H.I.E.L.D. subsequently took Rattler and the rest of the Society into custody.

Very little is known about Rattler's past. He was very popular with the ladies of the Serpent Society, as Black Mamba recommended him to Diamondback for a "good time."

Rattler joined the group of criminals aiding the Thunderbolts during The Civil War, alongside fellow Serpent Society members Cobra and Bushmaster.

He appeared in Brand New Day as one of the villains in the bar.

Rattler was later apparently killed by Scourge.

As part of the All-New, All-Different Marvel event, Rattler appears as a member of Viper's Serpent Society under its new name of Serpent Solutions.

Powers and abilities
He also has the ability to generate sonic vibrations by activating mechanisms in the "rattle" at the tip of the tail for various effects, including creating shockwaves, deflecting projectiles, and inducing vertigo, disorientation, unconsciousness, internal hemorrhaging, and possible death in opponents.

Rattler is 85% deaf in both ears and wears electronic hearing aids in his cowl. He possesses fang-like teeth.

Other characters named Rattler

Heath Benson

In the Wild West, Heath Benson was a part of a group of aerialists until he ended up injured in a fall. Unable to continue the act, he was hired as a ringmaster for a traveling circus. At some point, he used his talents in a career of crime and became Rattler. Rattler began to loot towns and other settlers in the vicinity of the circus. After Rattler nearly killed one of his victims, Two-Gun Kid was drafted to bring him in. Rattler bested Two-Gun Kid and escaped after the first encounter. Two-Gun Kid suspected that Rattler was someone that worked in the circus. Two-Gun Kid suspected the aerialist Whirlo of being Rattler and challenged him to aerial combat which ended with Two-Gun Kid winning. Just then, the real Rattler shows up and challenges Two-Gun Kid to a rematch. Two-Gun Kid succeeded in knocking him out in aerial combat and unmasked him to be the circus ringmaster. Rawhide Kid claimed to have known it all the time upon seen the ringmaster's picture in the weekly gazette a few back.

Rattler later escaped from prison and Whirlo used this information to pose as Rattler to commit crimes while the original one was blamed.

In 1876, Rattler joined forces with Iron Mask, Hurricane, Red Raven, Dr. Danger, and Fat Man in organizing a large number of criminals based on the exploits of the cowboy heroes and some time-traveling modern age heroes that have fought Kang the Conqueror. The West Coast Avengers traveled back in time and assisted Rawhide Kid, Two-Gun Kid, and Phantom Rider (Lincoln Slade) into bringing them in. Rattler tried to ambush Tigra, only for her to throw him into Hurricane forcefully enough to knock both of them out.

Rattler's real name was revealed in Marvel Westerns: Outlaw Files.

Whirlo

As mentioned above, Whirlo was an aerialist who was suspected by Two-Gun Kid to be the Rattler. He was challenged to an aerial battle by Two-Gun Kid and was defeated

When Rattler had escaped from prison, Whirlo learned about this. When Two-Gun Kid visited the circus where Whirlo worked, Whirlo claimed that Rattler is after him for revenge after failing to defeat Rawhide Kid. Two-Gun Kid figured out that Whirlo was acting as Rattler, tracked him down to the circus, and unmasked him. Whirlo claimed that he did it for revenge on Rattler for having framed him before.

Henry Bingham

Henry Bingham made his life devenomizing snakes until he was bitten by a particular specimen. He rushed to Curtis Chemicals where a chemist analyzed his blood and offered him an experimental anti-venom serum to save his life. He was cured, but began to change into the Rattler. However, Henry found that the changes weren't permanent and he began seeking more samples of the anti-venom serum to maintain his Rattler form. Exercising his idea of hiding in plain sight, Rattler walked through the streets wearing a sign that was advertising Reptile World. He walked right into Curtis Chemicals, fought right past the guards, and stole some of the anti-venom serum. He returned to Reptile World and took the samples to perpetuate his powers, but Mary Jane Watson took a picture of Peter Parker in front of the store just as Rattler walked by. Not wanting to have his secret lair discovered, Rattler plotted to steal the film that was used. Rattler followed Peter Parker and Mary Jane Watson back to Peter's apartment and ambushed them. Peter only feigned unconsciousness and then changed into Spider-Man to follow Rattler. Peter arrived at Reptile World and was zapped from behind while looking around. Upon regaining consciousness while tied to a chair, Peter is confronted by Rattler who tells him his origin as Peter claims that the serum is killing him. Rattler left Peter behind with some poisonous snakes and went to get more serum. Peter escaped, changed into Spider-Man, and began tracking Rattler. Upon finding Rattler, Spider-Man fought with him which ended with the serum's destruction. As the serum's effects began to fade, Rattler changed back to Henry Bingham who regained his sanity at last. Before dying from the side effects of the serum, Henry thanked Spider-Man for preventing him from being Rattler forever.

In other media
The Rattler appears in The Avengers: Earth's Mightiest Heroes animated television series episodes "Ultron-5", "Along Came a Spider...", and "Yellowjacket", voiced by Chris Cox. This version is a member of the Serpent Society.

References

External links
 Rattler at Marvel.com
 
 
 
 

Characters created by Dick Ayers
Characters created by John Romita Sr.
Characters created by Mark Gruenwald
Characters created by Paul Neary
Characters created by Stan Lee
Comics characters introduced in 1985
Fictional reptilians
Marvel Comics supervillains